Charles Gordon Howell III (born June 20, 1979) is an American professional golfer who currently plays on LIV Golf and formerly on the PGA Tour. He has been featured in the top 15 of the Official World Golf Ranking and ranked 9th on the PGA Tour money list in 2002. Known as one of the most consistent players on tour, he has garnered over 90 top-ten finishes in his career, earning about $42 million and has three PGA Tour victories, his most recent in 2018.

Early years and amateur career
Howell was born and raised in Augusta, Georgia, the home town of the Masters Tournament. He was introduced to golf at age 7 by next-door neighbor, Graham Hill, with whom he is still friends. He was a member of Augusta Country Club, which is adjacent to Amen Corner at Augusta National Golf Club. Howell graduated from Westminster Schools of Augusta, and soon after attended Oklahoma State University, where he majored in Business Management. In 2000, he was a member of Oklahoma State's winning team and also the individual winner at the NCAA Division I Golf Championship with a record-setting 23-under-par performance. Also in 2000, he won the Haskins Award honoring the most outstanding collegiate golfer in the United States.

Howell played in three professional events as an amateur. At the age of 17, Howell participated in his first PGA Tour event. He entered the Buick Challenge but missed the cut. The next year he missed the cut at the Canon Greater Hartford Open.

Professional career

2000
Howell turned professional in 2000. He played in his first tournament as a professional at the Canon Greater Hartford Open on July 2. He finished tied in 32nd place. Howell finished in 3rd at the John Deere Classic in only his third event. Howell played in 13 events in 2000 and made 7 cuts. He earned $263,533 but did not have an official money list rank because he was not a full PGA Tour member. He had his first career runner-up finishes on the Buy.com Tour at the Greensboro Open.

2001
Howell placed in the top-10 in two of his first four events of the 2001 season. In July at the Greater Milwaukee Open he lost to Shigeki Maruyama in a playoff. Howell also placed in 4th at the Reno-Tahoe Open and he finished in a tie for 3rd at the Michelob Championship at Kingsmill. Howell entered 24 events in 2001 and he made 20 cuts. Howell earned $1,520,632 and recorded five top-10 finishes. Just like in 2000, Howell did not have an official money list rank because he was not a full PGA Tour member. Due to his successful year, Howell won the PGA Tour Rookie of the Year award.

Also, in February Howell played in two European Tour events in Australia. He finished in a tie for 67th at the Heineken Classic and in a tie for 39th at the Greg Norman Holden International.

2002
Howell became a full PGA Tour member for the 2002 season. He had a strong start to the season by placing in the top-10 in three of his first five events. Howell won his first PGA Tour tournament at the Michelob Championship at Kingsmill in October. Four weeks later he finished in second at The Tour Championship. He finished 2 strokes behind champion Vijay Singh. Howell entered 32 events in 2002 and made 27 cuts. He recorded seven top-10 finishes. Howell earned $2,702,747 and finished 9th on the money list.

2003
Early in the 2003 season, Howell lost in a playoff to Mike Weir at the Nissan Open. Howell recorded his best finish in a major at the PGA Championship in August. He finished tied for 10th place. Howell finished as the runner-up at The Tour Championship for the second year in a row. This time he finished 3 strokes behind Chad Campbell. Two weeks later Howell represented the United States in the Presidents Cup. The competition ended in a draw. Howell was paired with Tiger Woods for the foursomes and four-ball matches. His overall record at the competition was 3-2 including a match play victory over fellow young golfer Adam Scott. Howell defeated Scott by the score of 5&4. Howell entered 31 tournaments and made 29 cuts. He recorded six top-10s and earned $2,568,955. Howell finished in 14th on the money list.

2004
Howell's 2004 season did not go as well as previous ones. His best finished was a solo 2nd at the Booz Allen Classic in June. He finished 4 strokes behind Adam Scott. Howell shot a 61 (-10) in the 1st round which still stands as his lowest round in a PGA Tour tournament. Howell entered 30 tournaments and made 22 cuts. He recorded five top-10 finishes. He earned $1,703,485 and finished 33rd on the money list.

2005
Howell started off 2005 strong with top three finishes in consecutive weeks. He finished in a tie for 3rd at the Sony Open in Hawaii and in a tie for second at the Buick Invitational. Howell was not able to pick up a victory in 2005 but he recorded six top-10 finishes including five top 5 finishes. Howell entered 29 tournaments and made 21 cuts. He earned $2,074,329 and finished 29th on the money list.

2006
Howell did not have a very successful season in 2006. His only success was a tie for second at the Zurich Classic of New Orleans and a solo second at the 84 Lumber Classic. Howell entered 30 tournaments and made 20 cuts. He recorded three top-10 finishes and only five top 25 finishes. He earned $1,553,105 and finished in 52nd on the money list.

2007
Howell bounced back from his disappointing 2006 season with a successful 2007 season. He recorded two runner-up finishes in his first three tournaments. He finished in a tie for 2nd at the Sony Open in Hawaii and in solo second at the Buick Invitational. On February 18, 2007 Howell won his second PGA Tour event. He won the Nissan Open by defeating Phil Mickelson in a playoff. The next week Howell made it to the round of 16 at the 2007 WGC-Accenture Match Play Championship. Two weeks later he finished in a tie for 6th at the PODS Championship. Howell did not enjoy much success after that. His best finish after the PODS Championship in March was at the WGC-CA Championship where he finished in a tie for 16th place. Howell entered the 2007 FedEx Cup Playoffs in 8th place in the points standings. He played in all 4 playoff tournaments. His best finish came at the BMW Championship where he finished in a tie for 18th place. Howell went on to finish in 18th place in the final FedEx Cup points standings. Howell has earned $2,832,091 in 2007 and is currently in 18th place on the money list. He has entered 26 tournaments, making 19 cuts. He has recorded five top-10 finishes. Howell also participated in the Presidents Cup in September. The United States won the competition and Howell was 2–2 in his matches. He won his singles match against Stuart Appleby by the score of 2&1.

2008
Howell recorded his worst finish on the money list in his career in 2008, finishing in 69th with $1,449,232. He finished tied for 8th in the first tournament of the year at the Mercedes-Benz Championship. His next top-10 finish came at the AT&T Classic in May where he finished tied for 8th. He led the tournament going into the final round but shot a 74 (+2) to lose the lead. Howell shared the lead going into the final round of the Turning Stone Resort Championship in October but ended up finishing tied for 3rd after shooting a 73 (+1). Howell made 22 of 31 cuts on the year while recording four top-10s, 12 top 25s and finishing 95th in the FedEx Cup standings.

2009
Howell started the 2009 season strong in January with a 4th-place finish in the Sony Open in Hawaii; three behind winner Zach Johnson. In March, Howell finished with a respectable T21 at the Puerto Rico Open. The next week, Howell had his best finish of the season by finishing T2 in the Transitions Championship. Howell was in position to win the tournament after the 14th hole, but subsequently bogeyed two of the last four holes to finish one stroke behind winner Retief Goosen. The week after the Transitions Championship, Howell finished T22 at the Arnold Palmer Invitational. At the Zurich Classic of New Orleans, Howell was again in position to win the tournament before bogeying two of the last four holes to finish two behind winner Jerry Kelly. Howell missed 6 cuts in 8 events from May to July. Howell recently made an instructional switch from David Leadbetter to Todd Anderson of the Sea Island Golf Club.

2010
Howell started the 2010 season strong posting top-10s in three of his first six tournaments, most notably a T-5 at the Sony Open in Hawaii. Howell had six top-10 finishes in 2010, while missing only 5 of 28 cuts. His best finish in 2010 was T-4 at the Waste Management Phoenix Open. He made $1,482,211.

2011
2011 was another consistent year for Howell. Howell's best finish of the year was a T-3, which happened twice in back to back weeks at the FedEx St. Jude Classic and the AT&T National tournaments. Howell had seven top-10 finishes in 2011 and qualified for the Tour Championship. He made $2,509,223.

2012
Howell only had two top-10 finishes in 2012: T2 at the Sony Open in Hawaii and T7 at the McGladrey Classic.

He changed coaches before the fall series to Gary Gilchrist.

2013
Howell had five top-10 finishes in 2013: T-3 at the Sony Open in Hawaii, playoff loss (T-2) at the Humana Challenge, T-9 at the Farmers Insurance Open, T-10 at the Shell Houston Open and T-10 at the Wells Fargo Championship. He finished 38th on the money list and 35th in the FedEx Cup.

2014
Howell had a good season in 2014 having six top-10 finishes and made 24 cuts. He finished T3 at the HP Byron Nelson Championship, T5 at the Shriners Hospitals for Children Open, T6 at the Waste Management Phoenix Open, T6 at the OHL Classic at Mayakoba, T7 at the CIMB Classic, and T8 at the Sony Open in Hawaii.

2015
Howell had another good season in 2015 having three top-10 finishes out of 23 cuts. He finished T5 at the Shell Houston Open, T5 at the Farmers Insurance Open, and T10 at the Valspar Championship. He finished T65 at the PGA Championship where he hadn't made the cut since 2011. He finished the end of 2015 being 77th on the money list and 79th on the FedEx Cup rankings.

2016
Howell had five top-10 finishes and earned $1,974,962 in the 2015–16 PGA Tour season. He made 21 cuts in 25 events. His best finish was T4 at the AT&T Byron Nelson. He finished 52nd in the FedEx Cup.

2017
Howell was the runner-up in the Farmers Insurance Open losing by three strokes to Jon Rahm. In July, he was a runner-up again, this time at the Quicken Loans National, losing in a playoff to Kyle Stanley. This took his tally of PGA Tour runner-up finishes to 16, and including one in the 2000 Buy.com Tour season, his career total is now 17. Howell finished 2017 with Tour earnings of $2,606,383, which was his highest in the last decade. The last time he earned at least that much was 2007, when he racked up $2,832,091, and it coincidentally was the year he won his last Tour title. Howell has now won at least $1,000,000 each season since his rookie year of 2001 (17 consecutive seasons), which is the second longest active streak on Tour, trailing only Phil Mickelson whose current streak started in 1996.

2018
Howell played in 28 events on the PGA Tour in the 2017–18 PGA Tour Season and made the cut in 24 of them. His best finish was a T4 in the OHL Classic at Mayakoba. He earned $2,179,725 and finished 53rd in the season-long FedEx Cup.

On November 18, 2018, Howell recorded his first win since 2007, defeating Patrick Rodgers on the second hole of a sudden-death playoff at the RSM Classic, and putting him at the top of the FedEx Cup standings going into the 2019 calendar year. This win gave him an exemption into the 2019 Masters Tournament in his hometown of Augusta, Georgia. He has not played in the Masters since 2012. This tournament was part of the 2018–19 PGA Tour season.

2019
Howell played in 27 events on the PGA Tour in the 2018–19 PGA Tour season and made the cut in 21 of them. His best finish was his win at the RSM Classic. He had 12 top-25 finishes. He earned $3,039,049 and finished 28th in the season-long FedEx Cup.

2020
In 2020, Howell made 14 of 20 cuts and had three top 10 finishes. He made the FedEx Cup Playoffs for the 14th consecutive year. He finished at No. 69 in the 2020 FedEx Cup.

2021
In 2021, Howell made 14 of 21 cuts but finished 139 in the 2021 FedEx Cup. He failed to make the FedEx Cup Playoffs for the first time in its 15 year existence. However, Howell retained his PGA Tour card because of his win in the 2018 RSM Classic.

2022
In 2022, Howell made 11 of 16 cuts on the PGA Tour with a best finish of T4 at the Valero Texas Open. In July 2022, Howell joined LIV Golf.

2023
In February, Howell won the LIV Golf Mayakoba event for his first individual title on the LIV Golf League.

Personal
Howell lives in Orlando, Florida with his wife, Heather (formerly Heather Myers), and their two children. Politically, Howell is a Republican albeit a "fanatically moderate" one.

Amateur wins
2000 NCAA Division I Championship

Professional wins (4)

PGA Tour wins (3)

PGA Tour playoff record (2–4)

LIV Golf League wins (1)

1Co-sanctioned by the MENA Tour

Results in major championships
Results not in chronological order in 2020.

CUT = missed the half-way cut
"T" = tied
NT = No tournament due to COVID-19 pandemic

Summary

Most consecutive cuts made – 12 (2001 PGA – 2004 PGA)
Longest streak of top-10s – 1

Results in The Players Championship

CUT = missed the halfway cut
"T" indicates a tie for a place
C = Canceled after the first round due to the COVID-19 pandemic

Results in World Golf Championships
Results not in chronological order prior to 2015.

1Cancelled due to COVID-19 pandemic

QF, R16, R32, R64 = Round in which player lost in match play
NT = no tournament
"T" = tied
Note that the HSBC Champions did not become a WGC event until 2009.

PGA Tour career summary

* As of the 2022 season
**Howell III was removed from the PGA Tour Career Earnings list once he joined LIV Golf in 2022. As of September 2022, he would be in the top 20 all-time.

U.S. national team appearances
Amateur
Palmer Cup: 1998 (tie)

Professional
Presidents Cup: 2003 (tie), 2007 (winners)

References

External links

American male golfers
Oklahoma State Cowboys golfers
PGA Tour golfers
LIV Golf players
Golfers from Augusta, Georgia
Golfers from Orlando, Florida
American people of Welsh descent
1979 births
Living people